Bibasis, the awlets, are a genus of skipper butterflies. The genus is confined to the Indomalayan realm. Vane-Wright and de Jong (2003) state that Bibasis contains just three diurnal species (B. aquilina, B. iluska, B. sena), the remainder having been removed to Burara.

Species
 Bibasis amara - small green awlet
 Bibasis anadi - plain orange awlet
 Bibasis aquilina (Speyer, 1879) South China to Amur, Japan. 
? Bibasis arradi Nicer
 Bibasis etelka (Hewitson, [1867]) Myanmar, Thailand, Laos, Vietnam, Malay Peninsula, Singapore, Borneo, Sumatra, Java, Palawan, Mindanao
 Bibasis gomata - pale green awlet
 Bibasis harisa - orange awlet
 Bibasis iluska (Hewitson, 1867) Sulawesi, Myanmar, Thailand, Laos
 Bibasis imperialis Plötz, 1886  Banggai, Sulawesi
 Bibasis jaina - orange-striped awl
 Bibasis jaina formosana (Fruhstorfer, 1911) Formosa
? Bibasis kanara (Evans, 1926)  South India
 Bibasis mahintha Moore 1874 Myanmar, Thailand, Laos - May be subspecies of Bibasis iluska (Hewitson, 1867)
 Bibasis miraculata Evans, 1949
 Bibasis oedipodea - branded orange awlet
 Bibasis owstoni Eliot, 1980 Malaysia
 Bibasis phul (Mabille, 1876) Celebes, Philippines
 Bibasis sena - orangetail awl
 Bibasis striata (Hewitson, [1867]) Vietnam, West China
 Bibasis tuckeri Elwes & Edwards, 1897 Sri Lanka, N.India, Malay Peninsula, Java, Borneo, Palawan, Mindanao, Sulawesi, Banggai, Sula
 Bibasis unipuncta Lee, 1962 Yunnan
 Bibasis vasutana - green awlet

References

External links

Images representing Bibasis at Encyclopedia of Life.

 
Coeliadinae
Butterflies of Indochina
Hesperiidae genera
Taxa named by Frederic Moore